Parthenon Zodeia, was a Cypriot football club based in Kato Zodeia. Founded in 1966, the team variously played in the Second and Third Divisions.

After the Turkish invasion of Cyprus and occupation of the city of Zodeia in 1974, the team was displaced to the southern part of the island, in Limassol. After some years the team dissolved due to financial problems.

References

Defunct football clubs in Cyprus
Association football clubs established in 1966
1966 establishments in Cyprus